Sallie Flournoy Moore Chapin (March 30, 1830 - April 19, 1896) was an American author and temperance worker. She was affiliated with the Ladies' Memorial Association, Soldiers' Relief Society, Ladies' Auxiliary Christian Association, Woman's Christian Temperance Union (W.C.T.U.), and the Woman's Press Association of the South.

Early life
Sarah ("Sallie") Flournoy Moore was born on March 30, 1830, in Charleston, South Carolina. Her maternal ancestors, Elizabeth Martha Vigneron Simons, were Huguenots, who came to the Colonies in 1685 and settled in Rhode Island. Her two great-grandfathers, Vigneron and Tousager, were killed in the Revolutionary War. On her father's side, George Washington Moore, the origins  were Scots from Northern Ireland. Her father was a Methodist minister of independent means but lost his home in Charleston fire of 1838, and he moved to the northern part of the State. Moore's father died in the pulpit at a union camp meeting, during the Civil War, after receiving a dispatch announcing the death of his son in a battle. 

Sallie Moore's sister, Georgia, was a writer and married Felix G. De Fontaine, a South Carolina journalist.

Moore was reared and educated in Cokesbury, South Carolina, where she attended one of the best academy in the state.

Career

From early childhood she showed a fondness and talent for authorship. Chapin wrote much, but she published only one book, Fitzhugh St. Clair, the South Carolina Rebel Boy; or, It Is No Crime to Be Born a Gentleman (1872), dedicated to the children of the Confederacy.

The war broke her family fortune: Leonard Chapin enlisted in the Fifth South Carolina Cavalry in 1861 and he served until October 1864, when he was wounded. He died in 1879 after the conflict ended. During the Civil War, Sallie Chapin was a supporter of the Confederacy; she was president of the Soldiers' Relief Society and of the Ladies' Auxiliary Christian Association and worked day and night in the hospitals. 

After the war, she was active in the Ladies' Memorial Association and as president of the Ladies' Christian Association she was instrumental in saving the local YMCA from extinction.

After attending a convention at Ocean Grove, New Jersey, in 1880, Chapin became involved in the W.C.T.U. In 1880 she organized the Charleston W.C.T.U., the first in the state and served as first State president elected in 1883, and she did much to extend that order in the South, where conservatism hindered the work for a long time. In 1881 she attended the convention in Washington, D.C., where she made a reply to the address of welcome on behalf of the South, ending with a poem setting forth the intentions of the W.C.T.U. 

She believed in prohibition as the remedy for intemperance, and was recognized as both a writer and conversationalist. In the Chicago W.C.T.U. convention, in 1882, when the Prohibition Home Protection Party was formed, she was made a member of the executive committee, and by pen and voice she popularized that movement in the South. She was at one time president of the Woman's Press Association of the South.

In 1888 she campaigned to open a State Industrial School for Girls in South Carolina; her effort led to the opening of the South Carolina Industrial and Winthrop Normal College, later Winthrop University.

At first against Women's suffrage in the United States, by 1891 she changed her position and avowed her support.

In 1895, already burdened by a failing health, Chapin sent a petition to the State Constitutional Convention to raise the statutory age of consent for women to eighteen years (it was at the time set to ten years). The new constitution raised the age of consent to sixteen years.

Personal life

On August 12, 1847, Sallie Moore married Leonard Chapin while she was still a girl, and her married life was singularly happy. Her husband, of a prominent family of Springfield, Massachusetts, was one of the founders of YMCA of Charleston, and one of its chief officers for years. 

The Chapins adopted Elizabeth Vigneron, the daughter of Sallie Chapin's brother, James O.A. Moore. They also adopted George Mendenhall Chapin; George & Son, edited by Nancy Lu Wilson Rose in 2009, are the letters, poetry and diary of George Mendenhall Chapin and describes the difficult relationship with his adoptive mother, Sallie Chapin. George's son, Thurston Adger Wilson, was to become a leading figure in the North Carolina labor movement of the 1920s and 1930s.

Sallie Chapin died on April 19, 1896. Her funeral was held at the Huguenot Church in Charleston and she was buried beside her husband in the Magnolia Cemetery (Charleston, South Carolina).

Legacy
The National Woman's Christian Temperance Union erected a granite monument over her grave at Magnolia Cemetery and in 1904 a drinking fountain at a busy intersection in Charleston was set up in her memory.

References

External links
 

1830 births
1896 deaths
American temperance activists
Woman's Christian Temperance Union people
Writers from Charleston, South Carolina
People from Cokesbury, South Carolina
19th-century American non-fiction writers
19th-century American women writers
American women non-fiction writers
Wikipedia articles incorporating text from A Woman of the Century
Burials at Magnolia Cemetery (Charleston, South Carolina)